This is a partial list of schools in the Republic of Ireland, listed by county. This list is accurate as of April 2020.

County Carlow

Secondary schools 
Carlow Vocational School
St Leo's College, Carlow
St. Mary's Knockbeg College

County Cavan

Primary schools 

 Kilnaleck Mixed National School, Kilnaleck
 Bailieborough Model School, Bailieborough
 Saint Mhuire National School, Swanlinbar
 Saint Cruabanai, Cruabanai
 St Clares Primary School, Cavan
 Milltown National School, Belturbet
 Corliss National School, Killeshandra
 Killeshandra National School, Killeshandra
 Ballyconell Central National School, Ballyconnell
 Farnham National School, Cavan
 Dromalis National School, Drumelis
 Billis Naitional School, Billis
 Darley National School, Cootehill
 St Brigids National School, Tunnyduff
 St Patricks Mixed National School, Lough Gowna
 Fairgreen National School, Belturbet
 Castletara National School, Ballyhaise
 Saint Lathrach National School, Muff
 Corlea National School, Kingscourt
 St Patrick's National School, Shercock
 Killygarry National School, Killygarry
 Scoil Bhride, Mountnugent
 St Michaels National School, Cootehill

Secondary schools
Virginia College, Cavan
St Clare's College, Cavan
Royal School, Cavan
Loretto College, Cavan
Breifne College, Cavan
St Patrick's College, Cavan
Bailieboro Community School, Cavan

County Clare

Primary schools
Ballycar National School
Ennis National School

Secondary schools
C.B.S. Secondary School Ennistymon
St. Anne's Community College
St. Flannan's College
St Joseph's Secondary School, Tulla
 Rice College Ennis

County Cork

Primary schools
Gurrane National School
North Monastery
Scoil an Chroí Ró Naofa
Scoil an Spioraid Naoimh

Secondary schools
Bandon Grammar School
Ballincollig Community School
Bishopstown Community School
Boherbue Comprehensive School
C.B.S. Charleville
C.B.S. Mitchelstown
Christian Brothers College, Cork
Coachford College
Coláiste Mhuire Crosshaven
Coláiste an Phiarsaigh
Coláiste an Spioraid Naoimh
Colaiste Choilm
Coláiste Chríost Rí
Douglas Community School
Glanmire Community College
Kinsale Community School
Midleton CBS Secondary School
Mount Mercy College, Cork
North Monastery
Presentation Brothers College, Cork
Rossa College
St Colman's Community College, Midleton
St. Colman's College, Fermoy
St. Francis College Rochestown
St. Mary's Secondary School (Charleville)
St Peter's Community School, Cork

County Donegal

Primary schools
Scoil Colmcille, Letterkenny

Secondary schools
Abbey Vocational School
Carndonagh Community School
Coláiste Ailigh
Deele College
De La Salle College Ballyshannon
Loreto Community School (Milford)
Loreto Convent Secondary School, Letterkenny
Moville Community College
Mulroy College
Pobalscoil Ghaoth Dobhair
St Eunan's College
Scoil Mhuire, Buncrana

County Dublin
 
The Kings Hospital School (1669)

County Galway

Primary schools
Creagh National School

Secondary schools
Ardscoil Mhuire
Calasanctius College
Coláiste Bhaile Chláir
Coláiste Iognáid
Coláiste na Coiribe
Garbally College
Gort Community School
Presentation College Headford
Presentation College, Athenry
St. Jarlath's College
St. Joseph's Patrician College
St Mary's College, Galway
Yeats College

County Kerry

Secondary schools
Coláiste na Sceilge
Dingle CBS
Mercy Secondary School, Mounthawk
St. Brendan's College, Killarney
St Mary's CBS (The Green)
St. Michael's College, Listowel

County Kildare

Primary schools
Gaelscoil Chill Dara

Secondary schools
Athy College
Clongowes Wood College
Coláiste Chiaráin
Colaiste Lorcain
Collegiate School Celbridge
Confey College
Gaelcholáiste Chill Dara
Kildare Town Community School
Leinster Senior College
Maynooth Post Primary School
Newbridge College
Patrician Secondary School
Piper’s Hill College
Salesian College Celbridge
Scoil Mhuire, Clane
St. Wolstan's Community School
St. Farnan's Post Primary School
St. Marks School Newbridge

County Kilkenny

Secondary schools
CBS Kilkenny
Presentation Secondary School, Kilkenny
Coláiste Éamann Rís
Kilkenny College
Loreto Secondary School Kilkenny
St Kieran's College
Scoil Aireagail
Castlecomer Community School
St. Brigid's College
Colaiste Mhuire, Johnstown
Grennan College
Kilkenny City Vocational School
Duiske College, Graiguenamanagh

County Limerick

Primary schools
Milford National School

Secondary schools
Ardscoil Rís, Limerick
Castletroy College
CBS Sexton Street
Coláiste Íde agus Iosef
Crescent College
Glenstal Abbey School
Laurel Hill Coláiste
St Munchin's College
Salesian Secondary College
Villiers Secondary School
Scoil Mhuire agus Ide
Desmond College
Scoil Na Trionoide Naofa
John the Baptist Community School, Hospital

County Longford

Secondary schools
Scoil Mhuire
St. Mel's College

County Louth

Primary schools
Grasta Christian School

Secondary schools
Ardee Community School
Coláiste Rís
De La Salle College Dundalk
Drogheda Grammar School
Dundalk Grammar School
Grasta Christian School
O'Fiaich College
Saint Mary's College of Dundalk
St. Louis Secondary School, Dundalk

County Mayo

Secondary schools
 Davitt College
Davitt college, Castlebar
St Colman's College, Claremorris
St Muredach's College
Sancta Maria College, Louisburgh
St. Gerald's College
Tourmakeady College
Sacred Heart Secondary School, Westport
Jesus And Mary Secondary School, Crossmolina

County Meath

Secondary schools
Gormanston College
Loreto Secondary School, St. Michael's
St Joseph's Mercy Secondary School (Navan)
St. Patrick's Classical School
St. Peter's College, Dunboyne
St. Oliver Post Primary School

County Monaghan

Secondary schools
St Macartan's College

County Offaly

Primary schools
Ballinagar National School
Ballinamere National School
Ballyboy National School
St. Ciaran's National School, Ballycumber
Bracknagh National School
Broughall National School
Cappagh National School
Charleville National School
Clonbullogue National School
Cloneygowan National School
Cloneyhurke National School
Clonmacnoise National School
Coolarney National School
Coolderry National School
Crinkill National School
Croghan Scoil Bhríde
Daingean National School
Dromakeen National School
Durrow National School
Monasteroris National School, Edenderry
Gaelscoil Éadan Doire, Edenderry
St. Mary's Primary School, Edenderry
St. Cynoc's National School, Ferbane
Gaelscoil an Eiscir Riada, Tullamore
Gaelscoil na Laochra, Birr
Scoil Naomh Eoin
Geashill National School
Gortnamona National School
High Street National School
Horseleap National School
Kilcormac Scoil Mhuire agus Chormaic
Killeigh National School
Kinnitty National School
Lumcloon National School
Mercy Primary School, Birr
Moneygall National School
Mountbolus National School
Mucklagh National School
Oxmantown National School, Birr
Rahan National School
Rashinagh National School
Rhode National School
Roscomroe National School
Seir Kieran National School, Clareen
Shinrone National School
St. Brendan's Boys Primary School, Birr
St. Cronan's National School, Birr
St. Francis' National School, Clara
St. Joseph's National School, Tullamore
St. Mary's National School, Cloghan
St. Patrick's National School, Edenderry
St. Philomena's National School, Tullamore
St. Rynagh's National School, Banagher
Tullamore Educate Together National School
Tubber National School
Walsh Island National School

Secondary schools
St. Brendan's Community School
Banagher College, Coláiste na Sionna
Sacred Heart Secondary School, Tullamore
Tullamore College
Colaiste Choilm
St Mary's Secondary School, Edenderry
Oaklands Community College, Edenderry
Gallen Community School
Ard Scoil Chiarán Naofa
Killina Presentation Secondary School
Coláiste Naomh Cormac

County Roscommon

Secondary schools
St Nathys College
Roscommon Community College

County Sligo

Secondary schools
Sligo Grammar School
Summerhill College
Ballinode College
Colaiste Iascaigh

County Tipperary

Primary schools
Gaelscoil Aonach Urmhumhan

Secondary schools
Cashel Community School
CBS High School Clonmel
Cistercian College, Roscrea
Our Lady's Secondary School, Templemore
Presentation Secondary School, Clonmel
Rockwell College
CBS Thurles
Coláiste Mhuire Co-Ed, Thurles
Presentation Convent, Thurles
Ursuline Convent, Thurles
CBS Nenagh
Borrisokane Community College

County Waterford

Primary schools
Waterpark National School

Secondary schools
Ard Scoil na nDéise
CBS Tramore
De La Salle College Waterford
Dungarvan CBS
Dungarvan College
Newtown School, Waterford
Waterpark College
Yeats College
St. Angela's Secondary School, Waterford

County Westmeath

Secondary schools
Athlone Community College 
Loreto College, Mullingar
Marist College, Athlone
St. Finian's College
Wilson's Hospital School
Coláiste Mhuire, Mullingar
 Mullingar Community Collage
 Castlepollard Community Collage
 Moate Community School
 Mercy Secondary School Kilbeggan

County Wexford

Secondary schools
Bridgetown Vocational College
Gorey Community School
St Augustine's and Good Counsel College, New Ross
St Peter's College, Wexford

County Wicklow

Primary schools
Saint Cronan's Boys' National School
St Gerard's School
Scoil Chualann

Secondary schools
Coláiste Chroabh Abhann
Coláiste Ráithín
North Wicklow Educate Together Secondary School
Presentation College, Bray
Saint Brendan's College
St Gerard's School
Scoil Chonglais
St David's Holy Faith Secondary School
Temple Carrig Secondary School
Gaelcholáiste na Mara, Arklow

Sources

See also

Education in the Republic of Ireland
List of Catholic schools in Ireland by religious order
List of fee-paying schools in Ireland
List of schools in Northern Ireland
List of higher education institutions in the Republic of Ireland

 
Ireland
Ireland
 Republic
Schools
Schools